James Carson Gardner (born April 8, 1933) is an American businessman and politician who served as a U.S. Representative (1967–1969) and as the 30th Lieutenant Governor of North Carolina (1989–1993).

Early life
Gardner was born in  Rocky Mount, North Carolina. He went to the public schools and North Carolina State University. Gardner served in the United States Army from 1953 to 1955.

Business career 
In May 1961, Gardner, along with Joseph Leonard Rawls, Jr., opened the first franchise store of the fast food restaurant Hardee's in Rocky Mount, North Carolina. Later, in 1969, he bought the troubled Houston Mavericks of the American Basketball Association and moved them to North Carolina a year later as the Carolina Cougars.

Political career 
Active in Republican politics from the days the party barely existed in North Carolina, Gardner first made a splash when he ran for Congress in 1964 and nearly defeated 30-year Democratic incumbent Harold D. Cooley, the powerful chairman of the United States House Committee on Agriculture. In 1966, Gardner (by then chairman of the North Carolina Republican Party) toppled Cooley by a shocking 13-point margin to represent a district that included Raleigh as well as his home in Rocky Mount.

He was an unsuccessful candidate for Governor of North Carolina in 1968, 1972, and 1992. In both 1968 and in 1992, he won the Republican nomination, but lost to Democrats Robert W. Scott and Jim Hunt, respectively. In 1972, he lost the nomination to Jim Holshouser, the first of only two Republican governors of North Carolina in the 20th century.

Lieutenant Governor 

In 1988, Gardner defeated Democrat Tony Rand and became the first Republican elected lieutenant governor since Charles A. Reynolds, who served from 1897 to 1901. Gardner served from January 1989 to January 1993, during the second term of Republican Governor James G. Martin. In response to the election of Republican Gardner, the Democratic-controlled General Assembly transferred many of the powers of the Lieutenant Governor over to the President Pro Tempore of the North Carolina Senate.

Political activity after retirement 
In September 2011, Gardner endorsed the (ultimately unsuccessful) 2012 candidacy of Wake County Commissioner Tony Gurley for lieutenant governor. As an "elder statesman," Gardner has been called one of the "Four Jims" of the North Carolina Republican establishment, the others being former Governors Holshouser and Martin and former U.S. Sen. Jim Broyhill. (Holshouser died in 2013) In January 2013, Gardner served as master of ceremonies at the inauguration ceremony for newly elected Gov. Pat McCrory, Lt. Gov. Dan Forest and other members of the North Carolina Council of State. The ceremony celebrated the return of Republicans to the governor's office for the first time since Gardner's defeat in 1992. Forest also became the first Republican Lieutenant Governor since Gardner (Democrats Dennis Wicker, Beverly Perdue, and Walter Dalton served in the post after Gardner).

At age 79, Gardner came out of retirement when McCrory appointed him chairman of the North Carolina Alcoholic Beverage Control Commission (a full-time position) in 2013.

References

External links 

|-

|-

|-

|-

1933 births
American Basketball Association executives
American food industry businesspeople
Businesspeople from North Carolina
Lieutenant Governors of North Carolina
Living people
Military personnel from North Carolina
North Carolina State University alumni
People from Rocky Mount, North Carolina
Republican Party members of the United States House of Representatives from North Carolina